Larry Brown (born March 23, 1951) is an American retired sprinter.

References

External links
 1975 Pan American 4 x 100 metres relay final

1951 births
Living people
American male sprinters
Place of birth missing (living people)
Athletes (track and field) at the 1975 Pan American Games
Pan American Games gold medalists for the United States
Pan American Games medalists in athletics (track and field)
Universiade medalists in athletics (track and field)
Universiade gold medalists for the United States
Medalists at the 1973 Summer Universiade
Medalists at the 1975 Pan American Games
20th-century American people